During the Parade of Nations section of the 1998 Winter Olympics opening ceremony, athletes from each country participating in the Olympics paraded in the arena. The flag from each team was borne by a sportsperson from that country chosen either by the National Olympic Committee or by the athletes themselves to represent their country. Unlike the usual practice, the parade of nations was organized according to the English alphabet instead of host nation's language, Japanese. Greece led the parade, followed by Andorra. Had the parade followed the Japanese characters, Greece would have been followed by Iceland, and Russia would have been the penultimate country before Japan. One sumo wrestler and one yukiko (lit. snow children) which bears a country name sign marched before each delegation. Some of famous sumo wrestlers such as Takanonami and Wakanohana accompanied the teams. The yukikos also took part in several other segments in the ceremony.

References

External links
Countries - Sports-Reference.com
おすもうさんと子供が先導　長野五輪 入場行進　ギリシャ(貴ノ浪)～フランス(琴龍) - YouTube
1998長野五輪　開会式（２）入場行進　Athletes March at Olympic Opening Ceremony - YouTube
1998 Olympics Opening Ceremony In Nagano Part 6
List of sumo wrestlers who accompanied the delegations

1998 Winter Olympics
Lists of Olympic flag bearers